The following is a list of notable deaths in December 2010.

Entries for each day are listed alphabetically by surname. A typical entry lists information in the following sequence:
 Name, age, country of citizenship at birth, subsequent country of citizenship (if applicable), reason for notability, cause of death (if known), and reference.

December 2010

1
Berlenti Abdul Hamid, 75, Egyptian actress, stroke.
W. Geoffrey Arnott, 80, British Hellenist.
Adriaan Blaauw, 96, Dutch astronomer.
Helen Boatwright, 94, American soprano, complications from a fall.
Hillard Elkins, 81, American talent manager and film producer (Alice's Restaurant, Richard Pryor: Live in Concert), heart attack.
Frank S. Emi, 94, American member of the Fair Play Committee.
Shahla Jahed, 39, Iranian convicted murderer, executed by hanging.
Charles N. Millican, 94, American academic, founding president of the University of Central Florida.
Richard P. Myers, 62, American politician, member of the Illinois House of Representatives (1995–2010), prostate cancer.
Sir Peter Wakefeld, 88, British diplomat.

2
*Michael Bunluen Mansap, 81, Thai Roman Catholic prelate, Bishop of Ubon Ratchathani (1976–2006).
Michele Giordano, 80, Italian Roman Catholic cardinal, Archbishop of Naples (1987–2006).
Chane't Johnson, 34, American actress, heart attack.
*Lee Huan, 93, Taiwanese politician, Premier of the Republic of China (1989–1990), cardiopulmonary failure.
Ernâni Lopes, 68, Portuguese politician, Minister of Finance (1983–1985).
Lauri Tamminen, 91, Finnish Olympic athlete.

3
Abdumalik Bahori, 83, Tajikistani writer.
Marvin Bass, 91, American college football player and coach.
Hugues Cuénod, 108, Swiss tenor.
Phil Jasner, 68, American sportswriter, cancer.
Elaine Kaufman, 81, American restaurateur, founder of Elaine's, emphysema and pulmonary hypertension.
Ma Ning, 88, Chinese major general, Commander of the PLA Air Force (1973–1977).
Donald Pass, 80, British abstract painter.
*José Ramos Delgado, 75, Argentine footballer and coach, Alzheimer's disease.
Ron Santo, 70, American baseball player and broadcaster (Chicago Cubs), member of MLB Hall of Fame, complications from diabetes and bladder cancer.
Skip Young, 59, American professional wrestler.

4
Manish Acharya, 40, Indian film director and actor, fall from horse.
Mohamed Mahbub Alam, 38, Bangladeshi Olympic sprinter, road accident.
Pamela Bryant, 51, American model, actress (H.O.T.S.), and Playboy Playmate of the Month (April 1978), natural causes.
Pierre de Beaumont, 96, Franco-American founder of Brookstone.
Lia Dorana, 92, Dutch actress and comedian.
Cathy Harvin, 56, American politician, member of the South Carolina House of Representatives (since 2006), breast cancer.
Torodd Hauer, 88, Norwegian Olympic speed skater.
King Curtis Iaukea, 73, American professional wrestler, after long illness.
Jacques Lafleur, 78, French politician, leader of New Caledonia anti-independence movement.
Ken Lehman, 82, American baseball player (Brooklyn Dodgers).
Birthe Nielsen, 84, Danish Olympic sprinter.
Adrienne Simpson, 67, New Zealand broadcaster and writer.
Heather Stilwell, 66, Canadian anti-abortion activist and politician, leader of the Christian Heritage Party (1993–1994), breast cancer.
Dagoberto Suárez Melo, 35, Colombian politician, Governor of Guaviare (2010), car crash.

5
Albano Albanese, 88, Italian hurdler and high jumper.
Alan Armer, 88, American Emmy Award-winning television producer (The Fugitive), colon cancer.
Shamil Burziyev, 25, Russian footballer, car crash.
David French, 71, Canadian playwright, cancer.
María Ester Gatti, 92, Uruguayan human rights activist.
Heda Margolius Kovály, 91, Czech author and Holocaust survivor.
John Leslie, 65, American pornographic film actor and director, heart attack.
Don Meredith, 72, American football player (Dallas Cowboys) and commentator (Monday Night Football), brain hemorrhage.
John Thomas Steinbock, 73, American Roman Catholic prelate, Bishop of Santa Rosa (1987–1991) and Fresno (since 1991), lung cancer.
Virgilio Teixeira, 93, Portuguese actor (Return of the Seven, The Fall of the Roman Empire, El Cid).

6
Mariá Álvarez Rios, 91, Cuban composer, pianist and educator.
Frank Bessac, 88, American anthropologist, stroke. 
Tom Crowe, 88, Irish-born British presenter (BBC Radio 3).
Mark Dailey, 57, American-born Canadian television journalist and announcer, cancer.
Ambrosio Echebarria Arroita, 88, Spanish Roman Catholic prelate, Bishop of Barbastro-Monzón (1974–1999).
René Hauss, 82, French footballer.
Norman Hetherington, 89, Australian cartoonist and television personality.
Ferenc Keszthelyi, 82, Hungarian Roman Catholic prelate, Bishop of Vác (1992–2003).
James Thomas Lynn, 83, American politician, Secretary of Housing and Urban Development (1973–1975), complications from a stroke.
Vic Lynn, 85, Canadian ice hockey player (Chicago Blackhawks, New York Rangers).
Imre Mathesz, 73, Hungarian footballer and coach, car crash.
Art Quimby, 77, American college basketball player (UConn).
Hank Raymonds, 86, American college basketball coach (Marquette), cancer.
Roy R. Rubottom, Jr., 98, American diplomat.
Martin Russ, 79, American author and United States Marine.
T. E. Srinivasan, 60, Indian cricketer, brain cancer.
Júlio Tavares Rebimbas, 88, Portuguese Roman Catholic prelate, Archbishop of Porto (1982–1997).
Ellen Ugland, 57, Norwegian billionaire.

7
Murat Akhedzhak, 48, Russian politician, heart attack.
Peter Andry, 83, Australian-born British record producer (Decca Records, EMI Classics), cancer.
Muzaffer Atac, 77, Turkish-American physicist.
John E. Baldwin, 79, British astronomer.
Hendrik Coetzee, 35, South African kayaker and adventurer, crocodile attack.
Cardell Camper, 58, American baseball player.
Elizabeth Edwards, 61, American author, lawyer and political activist, breast cancer.
*Fan Yew Teng, 68, Malaysian politician and human rights activist, cancer.
John A. Ferraro, 64, American television actor and director, colon cancer.
Samuel Pailthorpe King, 94, American district court judge (District of Hawaii, 1972–1984), injuries from a fall.
Art Mahan, 97, American baseball player (Philadelphia Phillies) and college baseball coach (Villanova), heart failure.
Gus Mercurio, 82, American-born Australian boxing promoter, international boxing judge and actor.
Kari Tapio, 65, Finnish schlager singer, heart attack.
Federico Vairo, 80, Argentine footballer and coach, stomach cancer.
Armin Weiss, 83, German chemist and politician.
Arnold Weiss, 86, German-born American soldier, helped discover Adolf Hitler's will, pneumonia.

8
Poul Andersen, 82, Danish footballer.
Murray Armstrong, 94, Canadian ice hockey player (Detroit Red Wings, Toronto Maple Leafs) and coach (University of Denver), complications from a stroke.
Walter Haeussermann, 96, German-born American rocket scientist, complications from a fall.
John James, 76, Australian footballer, Brownlow Medallist, stroke.
Trev Thoms, 60, British guitarist (Inner City Unit, Atomgods), pancreatic cancer.

9
Andy Anderson, 97, American retired major general, Mayor of Naples, Florida (1978–1982).
John Makepeace Bennett, 89, Australian computer scientist.
John du Pont, 72, American billionaire and murderer, natural causes.
Chuck Jordan, 83, American automobile designer (General Motors).
Alexander Kerst, 86, Austrian actor.
James Moody, 85, American jazz saxophonist and flautist ("Moody's Mood for Love"), pancreatic cancer.
Fausto Sarli, 83, Italian fashion designer.
Dov Shilansky, 86, Israeli politician, Speaker of the Knesset (1988–1992).
Thorvald Strömberg, 79, Finnish Olympic sprint canoeist.
Boris Tishchenko, 71, Russian composer.
Ángel Torres, 82, Cuban author and historian.

10
Nicolas Astrinidis, 89, Romanian-born Greek composer, pianist, conductor, and educator.
Marcel Domingo, 86, French footballer.
John Fenn, 93, American chemist and Nobel laureate.
J. Michael Hagopian, 97, Ottoman-born American documentary filmmaker.
George Pickow, 88, American photographer and film-maker.
Jacques Swaters, 84, Belgian racing driver.

11
José dos Santos Garcia, 97, Portuguese-born Mozambican Roman Catholic prelate, Bishop of Porto Amélia (1957–1975).
Dick Hoerner, 88, American football player (Los Angeles Rams), stroke.
Ronnie McMahon, 68, Irish Olympic equestrian.
MacKenzie Miller, 89, American racehorse trainer, owner and breeder, Hall of Famer, complications of a stroke.
Urszula Modrzyńska, 82, Polish actress.
Roger Nicole, 95, Swiss-born American Evangelical Christian theologian.
Peter Risi, 60, Swiss footballer, after long illness.
Gene Spangler, 88, American football player (Detroit Lions).
Guillermo Squella, 87, Chilean Olympic equestrian.

12
Manuel Caballero, 79, Venezuelan historian, journalist and author, complications following prostate surgery.
Jannie Greeff, 75, South African Olympic weightlifter.
Lachhiman Gurung, 92, Nepalese-born British soldier, recipient of the Victoria Cross.
Raymond Kalisz, 83, American-born Papuan Roman Catholic prelate, Bishop of Wewak (1980–2002).
Timothée Malendoma, 75, Central African politician, Prime Minister (1992–1993).
Ros Mey, 85, Cambodian-born American Buddhist monk and community leader, survivor of Khmer Rouge regime.
Carleton Naiche-Palmer, 63, American tribal leader, President of the Mescalero Apache (2008–2010).
Emmanuel Ogoli, 21, Nigerian footballer.
B. S. Ranga, 93, Indian film director.
Helen Roberts, 98, British singer and actress.
William Thompson, 71, British politician, MP for West Tyrone (1997–2001).
Tom Walkinshaw, 64, British engineer and racing team owner (Tom Walkinshaw Racing, Arrows), cancer.

13
James Dibble, 87, Australian television news presenter, cancer.
Claude Foussier, 85, French Olympic sports shooter.
Maynard W. Glitman, 77, American diplomat, negotiator of the Intermediate-Range Nuclear Forces Treaty, complications from dementia.
Rick Griffiths, 62, Australian Aboriginal activist and ATSIC commissioner.
Richard Holbrooke, 69, American diplomat, Ambassador to Germany (1993–1994) and United Nations (1999–2001), complications from aortic dissection.
Enrique Morente, 67, Spanish flamenco singer.
Remmy Ongala, 63, Tanzanian singer.
Karen Sortito, 49, American movie marketing executive, cancer.
Takeshi Watabe, 74, Japanese voice actor (Cowboy Bebop, Fist of the North Star, Naruto), pneumonia.

14
Florence Armstrong, 82, Irish teacher.
Håkon Christie, 88, Norwegian architect.
Timothy Davlin, 53, American politician, Mayor of Springfield, Illinois (since 2003), suicide by gunshot.
Robyn Dawes, 74, American psychologist and professor.
Adalbert Eledui, 62, Palauan senator and conservationist, after long illness.
Ruth Park, 93, New Zealand-born Australian novelist.
Neva Patterson, 90, American actress (An Affair to Remember, All the President's Men), complications from a broken hip.
Pascal Rakotomavo, 76, Malagasy politician, Prime Minister (1997–1998), cardiovascular attack.
Dale Roberts, 24, English footballer (Rushden & Diamonds), suicide by hanging.
Alberto Segado, 66, Argentine actor (Asesinato en el Senado de la Nación).

15
Ken Ablack, 91, Trinidadian cricket player.
Téclaire Bille, 22, Equatoguinean football player, road accident.
Domini Blythe, 63, British-born Canadian stage and film actress (Mount Royal, Search for Tomorrow), cancer.
Rachel Bromwich, 95, British scholar.
Carlos Pinto Coelho, 66, Portuguese journalist and television personality, complications from aortic surgery.
Bernard Patrick Devlin, 89, Irish-born Roman Catholic Bishop of Gibraltar (1985–1998).
Blake Edwards, 88, American film director, producer and screenwriter (The Pink Panther, Breakfast at Tiffany's), pneumonia.
Anthony Enahoro, 87, Nigerian political activist.
Pablo Ndong Esi, 41, Equatoguinean football player and manager, road accident.
Bob Feller, 92, American baseball player (Cleveland Indians), member of Baseball Hall of Fame, leukemia.
Teuvo Hatunen, 66, Finnish Olympic skier.
Stan Heal, 90, Australian footballer, member of the Australian Football Hall of Fame.
Solange Michel, 98, French mezzo-soprano.
Tom Newnham, 84, New Zealand political activist and educationalist, cancer.
Jean Rollin, 72, French film director, actor and novelist, after long illness.
Eugene Victor Wolfenstein, 70, American social theorist and psychoanalyst, professor of political science (UCLA), cancer.

16
Irwin Abrams, 96, American historian.
Richard Adeney, 90, British flautist.
Frank Baldino, Jr., 57, American pharmacologist, founder of the pharmaceutical firm Cephalon, leukemia.
Melvin E. Biddle, 87, American Medal of Honor recipient.
John David Duty, 58, American convicted murderer, first person executed in the US using pentobarbital, executed by lethal injection.
François Gayot, 83, Haitian Roman Catholic prelate, Archbishop of Cap-Haïtien (1974–2003).
Reg Hope, 83, Australian politician, member of the Tasmanian Legislative Council (1979–1997).
Sterling Lyon, 83, Canadian politician, Premier of Manitoba (1977–1981).
Mary Jane Odell, 87, American journalist, lecturer, and politician.
E. Gene Smith, 74, American Tibetologist.
A. T. Q. Stewart, 81, Northern Irish historian.
Karen Tuttle, 90, American viola teacher, after long illness.

17
Glen Adams, 65, Jamaican musician.
Silvino Barsana Agudo, 93, Filipino lawyer and businessman.
Arne Arnesen, 82, Norwegian diplomat and politician.
Captain Beefheart, 69, American rock musician and artist (Trout Mask Replica), complications from multiple sclerosis.
Ralph Coates, 64, English footballer (Burnley, Tottenham Hotspur, Leyton Orient, England), stroke.
Walt Dropo, 87, American baseball player (Boston Red Sox, Baltimore Orioles).
Dick Gibson, 92, English racing driver.
Eugene Goldwasser, 88, American scientist, first to purify EPO extracts, prostate cancer.
Anton Kunz, 95, Austrian Olympic water polo player
Nikos Papatakis, 92, Greek film director.
Martti Pennanen, 87, Finnish film and stage actor.
Lina Romay, 91, American actress and singer.
María Jesús San Segundo, 52, Spanish diplomat, economist and academic, Minister of Education and Science (2004–2006), cancer.
Sulaiman Taha, 59, Malaysian politician, member of the Johor State Legislative Assembly.
Mikhail Umansky, 58, Russian-born German chess grandmaster.

18
Rudolf Ahlswede, 72, German mathematician.
John Bukovsky, 86, Slovak-born American Roman Catholic prelate, Apostolic Nuncio to Romania (1990–1994) and Russia (1994–2000).
Phil Cavarretta, 94, American baseball player (Chicago Cubs, Chicago White Sox), complications from a stroke.
Ann Cindric, 88, American AAGPBL baseball player.
Morris L. Cohen, 83, American legal librarian, leukemia.
Clay Cole, 72, American television host (The Clay Cole Show) and DJ.
Norberto Díaz, 58, Argentine actor.
Rafael Fernández Álvarez, 97, Spanish politician, President of the Regional Council (1978–1981), first President of Asturias (1981–1983).
Steven W. Fisher, 64, American judge, cancer.
Max Jammer, 95, Israeli physicist.
Tasso Kavadia, 89, Greek actress and artist.
Gerard Mansell, 89, British broadcasting executive.
Tommaso Padoa-Schioppa, 70, Italian banker and politician, Minister of Economy and Finance (2006–2008), proponent of the Euro, heart attack.
James Pickles, 85, English circuit judge and tabloid columnist.
Nash Roberts, 92, American television meteorologist.
Jacqueline de Romilly, 97, French philologist.
Eric Schmertz, 84, American labor negotiator, Dean of the Hofstra University School of Law.

19
Chris Condon, 88, American cinematographer (Jaws 3-D), 3D lens inventor.
LeGrand R. Curtis, 86, American Elder of the Church of Jesus Christ of Latter-day Saints (LDS Church).
Lupe Gigliotti, 84, Brazilian actress, lung cancer.
Anthony Howard, 76, British journalist, broadcaster and editor (New Statesman).
Murali Kuttan, 56, Indian athlete, Asian Games medalist.
Lucien Mathys, 86, Belgian cyclist.
Trudy Pitts, 78, American jazz organist, pianist and vocalist, pancreatic cancer.
Noah al-Qudah, 71, Jordanian Muslim scholar, Grand Mufti of Jordan (2007–2010).
Roy Romain, 92, British Olympic swimmer, stroke.
Helen Maynor Scheirbeck, 75, American educator and activist, stroke.
Mark A. Smith, 45, British-born American professor of pathology, hit and run accident.

20
John Alldis, 81, British chorus master and conductor.
Donna Atwood, 85, American figure skater, respiratory problems.
Aamer Bashir, 38, Pakistani cricketer, cancer.
Jacqueline Courtney, 64, American actress (Another World, One Life to Live), metastatic melanoma.
Giovanni Ferrofino, 98, Italian Roman Catholic prelate, Apostolic Nuncio to Haiti (1960–1965) and to Ecuador (1965–1970)
Gordon Foster, 89, Irish mathematician.
Brian Hanrahan, 61, British journalist, cancer.
Steve Landesberg, 74, American actor (Barney Miller, Forgetting Sarah Marshall), colorectal cancer.
James Mann, 90, American politician, U.S. Representative from South Carolina (1969–1979), Alzheimer's disease.
Magnolia Shorty, 28, American rapper, shot.
Patricia Thompson, 63, American television producer, Emmy Award-winning documentary director, cerebral hemorrhage.

21
Enzo Bearzot, 83, Italian World Cup-winning football manager and player.
W. Pete Cunningham, 81, American politician, Member of the North Carolina House of Representatives (1987–2008).
Elmo Gideon, 86, American artist and sculptor.
David Hennessy, 3rd Baron Windlesham, 78, British politician and television executive.
Oleksandr Kovalenko, 34, Ukrainian footballer (Dnipro, Shakhtar) and referee, suicide by jumping. 
Bertie Lewis, 90, British World War II RAF airman and anti-war campaigner.
Marcia Lewis, 72, American musical theatre actress and singer, cancer.
Catalina Speroni, 72, Argentine actress.
Jack Tracy, 83, American editor (Down Beat) and music producer (Chess, Mercury).

22
Jean Chamant, 97, French minister, senator (1977–1995).
David Cockayne, 68, British physicist.
Fred Foy, 89, American radio and television announcer (The Lone Ranger), natural causes.
Gianna Galli, 75, Italian operatic soprano.
Nalini Jaywant, 84, Indian actress.
John Macreadie, 64, Scottish trade unionist, brain tumour.
Vivi Markussen, 71, Danish Olympic sprinter.
Alan Shallcross, 78, British television producer.

23
Donald Allchin, 80, British Anglican priest and theologian
Gordon P. Allen, 81, American politician.
Celestino Rocha da Costa, 72, São Toméan politician, Prime Minister (1988–1991).
Jayaben Desai, 77, Indian-born British trade unionist (Grunwick dispute).
William Fones, 93, American jurist, Tennessee Supreme Court justice (1973–1990).
Fred Hargesheimer, 94, American USAAF pilot and philanthropist in West New Britain Province, Papua New Guinea.
Ibrahim Ismail, 88, Malaysian army general.
K. Karunakaran, 92, Indian politician, Chief Minister of Kerala (1977; 1981–1987; 1991–1995), stroke.
Kenneth B. Lee, 88, American politician, Speaker of the Pennsylvania House of Representatives (1967–1968; 1973–1974), melanoma.
José Antonio Momeñe, 70, Spanish Olympic cyclist.
Janine Pommy Vega, 68, American Beat Generation poet.

24
Edsel Albert Ammons, 86, American bishop.
Elisabeth Beresford, 84, British children's author, creator of The Wombles.
Philip Burton Jr., 76, American documentary filmmaker, Alzheimer's disease.
Jean-Marie Charpentier, 71, French architect and urban planner.
Ljubomir Ćipranić, 74, Serbian actor.
Frances Ginsberg, 55, American operatic soprano, ovarian cancer.
Per Karstensen, 95, Norwegian politician.
David Kenworthy, 11th Baron Strabolgi, 96, British peer, Member of the House of Lords.
John Matsko, 77, American football player (Michigan State Spartans).
Frans de Munck, 88, Dutch footballer.
Roy Neuberger, 107, American financier and arts patron.
José Orlandis, 92, Spanish church historian and priest.
Orestes Quércia, 72, Brazilian politician, Governor of São Paulo (1987–1991), prostate cancer.
Neil Rogers, 68, American radio personality, heart failure.
Myrna Smith, 69, American singer and songwriter (Sweet Inspirations), kidney failure.
Yuri Starunsky, 65, Russian Olympic silver (1976) and bronze (1972) medal-winning volleyball player, stroke.
Eino Tamberg, 80, Estonian composer.
Viper, 51, American pornographic actress, lung cancer.
John Warhola, 85, American museum founder (The Andy Warhol Museum), brother of Andy Warhol, pneumonia.

25
Aron Abrams, 50, American screenwriter and television producer (King of the Hill, Everybody Hates Chris, 3rd Rock from the Sun).
Joan Alexander, 98, Scottish singer.
Kevin Boyle, 67, Northern Irish law professor and human rights activist, cancer.
Gavin Brown, 68, Australian academic, Vice-Chancellor of the University of Sydney (1996–2008).
John Bulaitis, 77, British-born Lithuanian Roman Catholic prelate, Apostolic Nuncio to Albania (1997–2008).
Bud Greenspan, 84, American Olympic filmmaker, Parkinson's disease.
Robert E. Kennedy, 95, American university president (California Polytechnic).
Eric Laakso, 54, American football player (Miami Dolphins), natural causes. (body found on this date)
Luis Manresa Formosa, 95, Guatemalan Roman Catholic prelate, Bishop of Los Altos Quetzaltenango-Totonicapán (1955–1979).
Jorge Mayer, 95, Argentine Roman Catholic prelate, Archbishop of Bahía Blanca (1972–1991).
Sir Iain Noble, 75, Scottish businessman.
Karl Olson, 80, American baseball player.
Carlos Andrés Pérez, 88, Venezuelan politician, President (1974–1979; 1989–1993), heart attack.
Qian Yunhui, 53, Chinese dissident.
A. N. Ray, 98, Indian jurist, Chief Justice of the Supreme Court of India (1973–1977).
Maurice Rioli, 53, Australian VFL player and politician, member of the NT Legislative Assembly for Arafura (1992–2001), heart attack.
Irina Zuykova, 52, Soviet Olympic equestrian.

26
John Archibald Armstrong, 93, Canadian business executive.
Salvador Jorge Blanco, 84, Dominican Republic politician, President (1982–1986).
Wade Crane, 66, American pool player, automobile accident.
Geraldine Doyle, 86, American factory worker, possible inspiration for the "We Can Do It!" poster.
Jonas Falk, 66, Swedish character actor.
Eugene K. Garfield, 74, American founder of the Auto-Train Corporation, esophageal cancer.
Albert Ghiorso, 95, American nuclear scientist, co-discovered twelve chemical elements.
Miguel Maria Giambelli, 90, Brazilian Roman Catholic prelate, Bishop of Bragança do Pará (1980–1996).
Bill Jones, 89, English international footballer, natural causes.
Matthew Lipman, 87, American educator.
Robert Macauley, 87, American manufacturer, founder of AmeriCares, emphysema.
Teena Marie, 54, American singer and composer.
Ian Samuel, 95, British Royal Air Force pilot and diplomat.
Jessie Rae Scott, 81, American gubernatorial First Lady (1969–1973), widow of North Carolina governor Bob Scott, after long illness.
Bernard Wilson, 64, American singer (Harold Melvin & the Blue Notes), stroke and heart attack.

27
Keith Andrew, 81, English cricketer.
Walter Balmer, 62, Swiss footballer.
Bernard-Pierre Donnadieu, 61, French actor, cancer.
Raphael Hillyer, 96, American violist, founding member of the Juilliard String Quartet, heart failure.
Alfred E. Kahn, 93, American economist, cancer.
Maureen Lehane, 78, British singer and music festival organiser.
Jack Leslie, 90, Canadian politician, Mayor of Calgary (1965–1969).
Grant McCune, 67, American visual effects artist (Star Wars, Star Trek: The Motion Picture, Speed), Oscar winner (1978), pancreatic cancer.
Michael O'Pake, 70, American politician, longest serving member of the Pennsylvania State Senate (since 1973), complications from surgery.
Sir David Scott, 91, British diplomat.

28
Atina Bojadži, 66, Macedonian marathon swimmer, first Yugoslavian woman to swim across the English Channel.
Frank Bonilla, 85, American academic of Puerto Rican descent, long illness.
Bennie Briscoe, 67, American boxer.
Avi Cohen, 54, Israeli footballer, motorcycle accident.
Chris Colmer, 30, American college football player (NC State)
Denis Dutton, 66, American-born entrepreneur and philosopher, creator of Arts & Letters Daily and Bad Writing Contest, prostate cancer.
Donald Fraser, 83, American politician.
Joseph Grech, 62, Maltese-born Australian Roman Catholic prelate, Bishop of Sandhurst (since 2001), blood disorder
Fred Heron, 66, American football player (St. Louis Cardinals).
Brandon Joyce, 26, American football player (St. Louis Rams, Minnesota Vikings), shot.
Gene Kelton, 55, American blues, rock and rockabilly singer and guitarist, multiple injuries from vehicle collision.
Bill Lajoie, 76, American baseball scout and executive (Detroit Tigers).
Zeferino Nandayapa, 79, Mexican classical marimbist, injuries from a fall.
Terry Peder Rasmussen, 67, American serial killer.
Hideko Takamine, 86, Japanese actress.
Billy Taylor, 89, American jazz pianist and composer (I Wish I Knew How It Would Feel to Be Free), heart attack.
Jeff Taylor, 80, English footballer.
Agathe von Trapp, 97, Austrian-born American singer, member of the Trapp family (The Sound of Music).
Peter Walker, 91, British Anglican prelate, Bishop of Ely (1977–1989).

29
Gratien Ananda, 53, Sri Lankan singer, composer, songwriter and lyricist.
Vladan Batić, 61, Serbian politician and lawyer, Minister of Justice (2001–2003), throat cancer.
Steve Boros, 74, American baseball player (Tigers) and manager (Athletics, Padres), complications from multiple myeloma.
Jimmy Coffey, 101, Irish hurler.
John Doyle, 80, Irish hurler.
Bill Erwin, 96, American actor (Seinfeld, Falcon Crest, The Twilight Zone).
Mondine Garcia, 75, French Gypsy jazz guitarist.
Pavel Kolchin, 80, Russian Olympic gold (1956) and bronze (1956, 1964) medal-winning cross-country skier.
Ramón Montesinos, 67, Spanish footballer.
Sören Wibe, 64, Swedish economist and politician, Junilistan party leader, member of the European Parliament and the Riksdag.

30
Nikolay Abramov, 26, Russian footballer.
Michael Allinson, 90, British-American actor.
Paul Calle, 82, American artist, postage stamp designer, melanoma.
Donald Carroll, 70, American author.
Sir Ellis Clarke, 93, Trinidadian politician, Governor-General (1972–1976) and President (1976–1987), complications from a stroke.
V. Balakrishna Eradi, 88, Indian jurist, judge of the Supreme Court of India.
Bobby Farrell, 61, Aruba-born dancer and entertainer (Boney M.).
Thomas Funck, 91, Swedish author, composer and director.
Miranda Guinness, Countess of Iveagh, 71, British aristocrat.
Roger Milliken, 95, American textile executive (Milliken & Company).
Tony Proudfoot, 61, Canadian CFL football player, amyotrophic lateral sclerosis.
Malcolm Spence, 73, South African Olympic bronze medal-winning (1960) athlete.
Eric Teed, 84, Canadian politician, Mayor of Saint John, New Brunswick (1960–1964).
Tom Vandergriff, 84, American politician, Mayor of Arlington, Texas (1951–1977) and U.S. Congressman from Texas (1983–1985).
Gina Wilkinson, 50, Canadian actress (Hangin' In), cervical cancer.
Jenny Wood-Allen, 99, Scottish athlete and politician, world record holder for the oldest female marathon finisher.
Betty Yahr, 87, American baseball player.
Barry Zorthian, 90, American press officer during Vietnam War.

31
Jesús María Coronado Caro, 92, Colombian Roman Catholic prelate, Bishop of Girardot (1973–1981) and Duitama–Sogamoso (1981–1994).
Raymond Impanis, 85, Belgian professional cyclist.
William Harding le Riche, 94, South African-born Canadian epidemiologist.
Tove Maës, 89, Danish actress.
Per Oscarsson, 83, Swedish actor, injuries sustained in a fire.
*Shi Tiesheng, 59, Chinese writer, cerebral hemorrhage.
Syd Ward, 103, New Zealand cricketer.
John P. Wheeler III, 66, American presidential aide, first chairman of the Vietnam Veterans Memorial Fund. (body found on this date)

References

2010-12
 12